Anton Friedrich von Krockow (4 January 1714 – 7 September 1778) was a Prussian lieutenant general.

Family
His parents were Philipp Reinhold von Krockow, a captain in the imperial army and heir of Polzin, and his wife Anna Maria von Borcke. His younger brother, Wilhelm (1719 – 1803), was a Prussian General of Infantry.

Krockow married Auguste Luise Heinriette Freiin von Lüders (d 1790). They had the following children

Karl Wilhelm (b. 1748), Prussian cadet
Ludwig Christian Friedrich (b. 1749), Prussian lieutenant
Karoline Wilhelmine (b.1752)
Auguste Christiane Friederike (* 1756) married Johann Georg von der Marwitz, a Prussian officer
Sophie
Henriette ∞ Ernst Vollrath von Kölichen auf Reisicht

Military career
Krockow had been a corporal since 1728 in the infantry regiment "von Holstein" of the Prussian army. On the recommendation of the Polish king Stanislaus I, he entered French service in 1735 and rose there to colonel of the cavalry. His repeated requests for re-establishment in the Prussian service were not fulfilled until March 1757 by King Frederick, although Krockow was granted a patent of 1 May 1748, as colonel and general adjutant. After the death of the major general Christian Friedrich von Blanckensee, Krockow received his place as head of Blanckensee's former dragoon regiment. During the Seven Years' War, he became lieutenant general. He took part in the battles near Prague, Kolin, Hochkirch, Liegnitz and Torgau. He was wounded at Leuthen. He remained in active service until April 1760.

In June, 1769, the King appointed him the chief officer of Neuenhagen and Freienwalde. On 18 January 1773, Frederick also made Krockow on a knight of the Black Eagle Order. At the beginning of the War of Bavarian Succession, he marched with his regiment from the garrison and died in a stroke in the King's camp.  Krokow was included on the Equestrian statue of Frederick the Great.

References

1707 births
1778 deaths
People from Połczyn-Zdrój
People from the Province of Pomerania
Prussian generals
Prussian military personnel of the Seven Years' War